"House of Cards" is a song written by Lynsey de Paul and Barry Blue and is one of their most covered songs. It was first released as a single by Chris Kelly (who went on to become the lead singer for Blackwater Junction and then became "Hollywood" with his wife Lynda Clarke) on the CBS label on 7 April 1972, credited as being written by Rubin (de Paul) and Green (Blue). The song was a radio hit in Italy, receiving multiple plays on national radio stations.

A few weeks later a second version of the song was also released as a single by the UK artist Heart and produced by Phil Swern and Johnny Arthey on RCA. The UK born but New Zealand based singer, Rob Guest, also released his version of "House of Cards" as his first solo single on Polydor in 1972. It also appeared as the lead track on Guest's album Sing. The song was also covered by the BBC Radio 1 DJ Tony Blackburn and appeared as a track on the self-named album released in 1972 on RCA which received favourable reviews. It was released for the first time on CD in 2012 on the Tony Blackburn compilation album The Singles Collection 1965-1980. Blackburn performed his version of the song on the ITV prime time programme 2G's & The Pop People on 17 June 1972. When reviewing the single released by "Heart" in Disc and Music Echo, John Peel wrote ""This sounds very much like Tony Blackburn singing under a pseudonym and if so puts me in a certain amount of difficulty".

In 1975, the Australian singer/pianist composer, John Christie, released a more uptempo, rockier version of the song, in contrast to the previous versions all of which had been ballads. Christie's version was produced by his mentor Dave Clark, as a single on Polydor. This version reached No. 15 on the Hessen chart. Christie and Clark went on to co-write “Time,” for the musical of the same name and performed by Freddie Mercury.

Barry Blue recorded the song with new lyrics and the title "Billy" which was released as a single in 1977 on the Private Stock record label and credited to Blue, de Paul and Stephen Worth. The track appeared on his Singles Collection compilation album released in 2002.

Although it was originally recorded in 1972 for her debut album but not included (according to the CD credits), the de Paul version had its first official release on her 2013 anthology, Sugar and Beyond: Anthology 1972-1974. However, a live version of "House of Cards", along with "Sugar Me" by De Paul as well as an interview with her, was released on the BBC Transcription Services album released to radio stations around the world in September 1972.

References

Songs written by Lynsey de Paul
Songs written by Barry Blue
1972 songs